Garra elongata is a species of ray-finned fish in the genus Garra from Manipur in north eastern India and possibly Myanamar.

References

Garra
Taxa named by Laishram Kosygin
Fish described in 2000